Graham Fletcher is an Australian diplomat who currently serves as the Australian Ambassador to China since August 2019.

Career
Fletcher received a Bachelor of Arts (honours) from the University of Sydney. He joined the Department of Foreign Affairs of Australia in 1983.

Fletcher has been described by ABC News as "a top China specialist who has served three postings in China as an Australian diplomat and is fluent in Mandarin Chinese". He has held the positions of Third Secretary, Beijing (1986–1988); Deputy Consul-General, Nouméa (1992–1994); Counsellor, Beijing (1997–2000); Deputy Head of Mission, Beijing (2004–2008); Head of DFAT North Asia Division (2008–2010; 2015–2019); and Deputy Head of Mission, Washington, D.C. (2011–2013). He led the Australian team in negotiations over the China–Australia Free Trade Agreement which was completed in 2014.

Personal life
Fletcher is married with three children.

References

Living people
University of Sydney alumni
Ambassadors of Australia to China
Australian diplomats
21st-century Australian public servants
Australian expatriates in New Caledonia
Australian expatriates in the United States
Year of birth missing (living people)